Traslasierra Valley (spanish: Valle de Traslasierra) is a natural geographic region of the province of Córdoba, Argentina, located west of the Sierras Grandes and east of the Sierras Occidentales. The tourist capital is the city of Mina Clavero and the most important commercial center is the city of Villa Dolores.

Because of its isolation until recent times, the area of Traslasierra Valley has a lower population density than the other valleys of the Sierras de Córdoba and has maintained the creole culture of gaucho type. From the 1980s, due to the difficulties of accessibility and the wild nature, the hippie movement or similar groups have settled in the area.

End of isolation
The Camino de las Altas Cumbres was conducted under the direction of Cura Brochero between the end of s. XIX and beginning of s. XX. Following sections of this road, in 1970 the route was consolidated as provincial route number 34, capable of supporting heavy and fast automobile traffic. This route unites Mina Clavero in Traslasierra Valley and Villa Carlos Paz in Punilla Valley.

Neighboring village
In the center and along the mountain range of nearly 2,900 meters, is a series of mountain villages:
 Nono
 Las Calles
 Las Rabonas
 Los Hornillos
 Quebrada de Los Pozos
 Villa de Las Rosas
 Los Molles
 Las Tapias
 Chuchiras
 San Javier
 Yacanto
 Luyaba
 La Paz

And important cities such as:
 Villa Cura Brochero
 Mina Clavero
 Villa Dolores

Population
According to provisional census data of 2010 nacional census, in Traslasierra live 100 331 people, distributed among the four departments in the valley: Department San Javier, San Alberto Department, Pocho Department and Department Mines. Over half the population lives in the first.

References

Landforms of Córdoba Province, Argentina
Valleys of Argentina